Hoseynabad (also Romanized as Ḩoseynābād; also known as Ḩoseynābād-e Zarand and Husainābād) is a village in Khoshkrud Rural District, in the Central District of Zarandieh County, Markazi Province, Iran. At the 2006 census, its population was 1,688, in 392 families.

References 

Populated places in Zarandieh County